Olcay Gülşen, also known as OJ Gulsen, (born 20 July 1980) is a Dutch fashion designer. She was the owner of fashion label "SuperTrash" from 2009 to 2018.

Life and career
Olcay Gulsen's parents are Kurdish born in Turkey. Gulsen was born in Waalwijk. She has four sisters (Dolshe, Georgina, Venus and Jasmin) and a brother (Gökhan). In 2002, Olcay Gulsen graduated from her Human Resource course. After graduation she moved to Amsterdam to start her first company, a HRM agency called Chill Agency, at the age of 21. She went on to start her second company named 2Stepzahead, importing international fashion brands. This gave her the opportunity to take on her third and biggest project to date: a fashion brand named SuperTrash. As of 2010, SuperTrash is sold in more than 2,000 sales points in 24 countries in Europe and America.
In February 2018 Olcay left SuperTrash. Four weeks later the company filed for bankruptcy leaving behind EUR 11 million of debt.

Awards
 2008: Jackie Magazine – Fashion Entrepreneur of the Year
 2010: Amsterdam Business Award
 2010: Marie Claire Prix de la Mode – Best Fashion Entrepreneur of 2010

Collaborations
2009: Olcay becomes the face of the new Philips Senseo coffee maker
2010: SuperTrash creates a Special Edition Dutch Dress for Bavaria
2010: Olcay becomes the face of Samsung
2012: SuperTrash creates a European Championship dress for Albert Heijn
2013: SuperTrash creates a dress to celebrate the 25th anniversary of Disneyland Paris
2013: Olcay becomes ambassador for the first Global Kids Fashion Week in London
2013: Olcay becomes ambassador for international non-profit foundation Challenge Day

Television appearances
 2009: Hollands Next Top Model: guest jury member
 2010: Project Catwalk: guest jury member
 2010: De Wereld Draait Door – regular guest
 2011: Project Catwalk The Netherlands – Main jury member
 2012: The Face: Olcay becomes a main mentor 
 2013: The Daily Buzz: Olcay has her own fashion segment on the US show
 2018: "Wie is de Mol" contestant

SuperTrash
The SuperTrash brand specializes in dresses, tops and pants. A shoe line was added to the collection in 2009, featuring primarily high-heeled shoes supplemented by glamorous flats. Later that year a denim collection named STenim was launched. In 2010, five brand stores were opened in The Netherlands (Utrecht – The Hague – Laren – Maastricht – Eindhoven), one in Ibiza and several shop-in-shops. Additionally, an Amsterdam and Rotterdam Brand Store opened in 2011. In 2012 the label expanded internationally, opening up a store and Headquarters on London's Carnaby Street and New York's Prince Street (permanently closed). In total there are now 15 brand stores internationally, including Antwerp, Gent and Wijnegem in Belgium. The brand also introduced its new label ST. Girls in 2012 to fashionably dress 6- to 16-year-olds. SuperTrash has also launched its own fragrance, Phenomenal and a range of nail polishes. In 2013 SuperTrash has evolved into a lifestyle brand instead of primarily a fashion label.

Personal
Olcay Gulsen lives in Amsterdam and London, was engaged to millionaire footballer Edgar Davids in 2006 but they split in 2012 which was seen on Dutch television RTL Boulevard. In 2019 she has a relationship with radio deejay Ruud de Wild.

References

External links
Interview with Dutch newspaper 'De ondernemer'

1980 births
Living people
Dutch people of Kurdish descent
Dutch fashion designers
Association footballers' wives and girlfriends
People from Waalwijk